The 1989 Swedish motorcycle Grand Prix was the thirteenth round of the 1989 Grand Prix motorcycle racing season. It took place on the weekend of 11–13 August 1989 at the Anderstorp circuit.

500 cc race report
Wayne Rainey takes pole, then it’s Kevin Schwantz and Eddie Lawson. Rainey gets the start, and Lawson moves into second, followed by Schwantz.

A lead group forms, with Rainey, a small gap to Lawson, then another small gap to Schwantz, Kevin Magee and Christian Sarron.

Schwantz cruises into the pits with a mechanical, and Lawson closes the gap to Rainey and moves into the lead. Sarron is in third a couple of bike lengths behind, and Wayne Gardner passes Magee for fourth spot.

With two laps to go, Rainey is right behind Lawson and highsides on the exit of a right-hander. It's a long tumble, but he gets up and doesn’t try to pick up the bike. Though it’s Rainey’s only real mistake all year, Lawson’s consistency and improvement brings him the win and a lead in the standings by 13.5 points. Sarron takes second, Gardner third.

Says Lawson of the lap that saw Rainey go down: "That was my fastest lap of the race; I'd never got on the throttle that early all race. When I cracked it open, Wayne followed me, and there was no way the Dunlop was going to do that. It wasn’t Wayne, it was the tyres."

500 cc classification

References

Swedish motorcycle Grand Prix
Swedish
Motorcycle Grand Prix